Bowen Construction was Ireland's sixth largest construction company and formed a core part of the broader Bowen Group which once had annual revenues approaching €350 million during Ireland's building boom. The Group had operations throughout the island of Ireland and the UK with main offices in Cork, Dublin and London (through its subsidiary Bowen PLC) as well as smaller regional offices in Limerick, Belfast and Waterford.

The Bowen Group is headed up by Chairman & Chief Executive John R. Bowen and is headquartered in Cork, Ireland.

On 25 July 2011 Bowen Construction was put into liquidation with the loss of at least 76 direct jobs. This followed Bowen UK being placed into administration earlier that month.

Projects
Some of the company's major projects included:

 Opera Avenue, Cork (€100m retail & residential scheme in Cork city centre)
 Old Bailey Office Complex, London (Stg£30m 90,000sq ft office building)
 Luas Light Rail Project - Sandyford to Cherrywood, Dublin (€75m light rail scheme)
 M7 Motorway Nenagh to Castletown (€60m National Motorway)
 Douglas Village Shopping Centre, Cork (€80m retail centre extension)
 Mahon Point Shopping Center, Cork

References

External links
 "Revealed: Builders' multi-million profits" - Sunday Business Post
 The Bowen Group Main company web site.
 Bowen PLC UK company web site.

Defunct construction and civil engineering companies
Construction and civil engineering companies of Ireland
Construction and civil engineering companies disestablished in 2011
2011 disestablishments in Ireland